Pennies in a Jar is a concept album from American singer and songwriter Nikki Jean, released July 11, 2011.

Background
The album follows Jean on an American songwriting journey as she travels the country writing with her heroes.  In the process Nikki wrote with over 30 hall of fame songwriters including Thom Bell, Luigi Creatore, Lamont Dozier, Burt Bacharach, Jeff Barry, Carole King, Bobby Braddock, Paul Williams, Jimmy Webb, Barry Mann and Cynthia Weil and Carly Simon.
 
Production was helmed by Sam Hollander and Dave Katz. Although most of the album was recorded while Nikki Jean was at Columbia Records, she was released from her contract midway through its creation. She landed a new deal a S-Curve Records and subsequently released the album. Lupe Fiasco appeared on the album's second single "Million Star Motel", alongside Black Thought.  She was invited to open for Mayer Hawthorne, on his nationwide concert tour.

Critical reception 

Her single "My Love" reached number eight in Japan on Hot 100 Singles chart and she toured Japan and Australia in support of the project. On July 14, she performed "How To Unring A Bell" on the Late Show with David Letterman to promote her album.

Allmusic's Andy Kellman stated the album is "very easy to enjoy" and "voiced by a remarkably refined artist who is neither squarely R&B nor pop.  The icing is "Steel and Feathers (Don’t Ever)," a gospel/country devotional left unfinished for 30 years until its writer, Bob Dylan, allowed Nikki Jean to complete and record it."  Jim Fusilli of The Wall Street Journal wrote, "Nikki Jean sings with warmth and sincerity, and while many of the compositions bring to mind the work of her famous counterparts, she's in there too."

Track listing

References

2011 albums
Pop albums by American artists